is Yuki Uchida's first album, released in Japan on 8 February 1995 by King Records (reference: KICS-470). It reached number one on the Oricon charts. It includes the title song from her previous number-one single Tenca wo Torō! -Uchida no Yabō-.

Track listing

  (0:57) 
  (4:16)
  (4:00)
  (4:36)
  (4:16)
  (4:22)
  (3:50)
  (4:49)
  (4:21)
  (4:06)
  (4:17)
  (1:34)

External links
 Oricon album profile

Yuki Uchida albums
1995 debut albums